Jefferson Cuero Castro (born 15 May 1988) is a Colombian footballer.

Club career
Cuero made his professional debut for Once Caldas on 6 March 2010 in a 3–0 loss against Deportivo Cali. Cuero started the match but was substituted at half time by Dayro Moreno. In his debut year he helped Once Caldas capture the 2010 Campeonato Finalización title. In 2012, he had a short stint at Independiente Medellín where he appeared in ten matches for the club. The following season Cuero moved to Santa Fe.

Cuero made his debut for Santa Fe at the 2013 Superliga Colombiana against Millonarios coming in for Cristian Borja in the 74th minute. Santa Fe would win the match 1–0 (3–2 on aggregate) and captured the 2013 Superliga Colombiana. On 21 December 2014 Cuero helped Santa Fe capture the 2014 Torneo Finalización after Santa Fe defeated his former team Independiente Medellín 3–2 on aggregate.

On 22 December 2014, the day after Cuero won the Campeonato Finalización with Santa Fe, it was announced Cuero was transferred to Liga MX club Monarcas Morelia

On 12 December 2017, he was transferred to Liga MX club Santos Laguna on a 1-year loan. On December 26, Morelia announced that the transfer of Jefferson Cuero to Santos Laguna had been canceled following an injury that the player had.

On 1 February 2018, it was announced Cuero was transferred to Categoría Primera A club América de Cali.

Honors
Once Caldas
Categoría Primera A (1): 2010-II

Santa Fe
Superliga Colombiana (1): 2013
Categoría Primera A (1): 2014-II

References

External links

Living people
1988 births
Colombian footballers
Colombian expatriate footballers
Once Caldas footballers
Independiente Medellín footballers
Independiente Santa Fe footballers
Atlético Morelia players
América de Cali footballers
Santos Laguna footballers
Águilas Doradas Rionegro players
Jaguares de Córdoba footballers
Categoría Primera A players
Liga MX players
Expatriate footballers in Mexico
Colombian expatriate sportspeople in Mexico
Association football wingers
People from Tumaco
Sportspeople from Nariño Department